Damon "Coke" Daniels is an American film director, screenwriter and film producer.  He wrote and co-produced the 2004 Miramax film My Baby's Daddy.  He also wrote, produced and directed the 2021 film Karen.  The latter film was nominated for Golden Raspberry Award for Worst Picture at the 42nd Golden Raspberry Awards, where Daniels received nominations for Worst Director and Worst Screenplay.

Filmography

References

External links
 

Living people
21st-century American screenwriters
American male screenwriters
American film directors
Screenwriters from New York (state)
Year of birth missing (living people)